Rod Wright may refer to:

Roderick Wright (1940–2005), Scottish bishop
Roderick Wright (politician) (born 1952), American politician
Rod Wright (rugby league), Australian rugby league footballer

See also
Rodney Wright (born 1979), American football player
Rodney Wright (Australian footballer) (born 1960), Australian rules footballer